Caleb Sprague Henry (1804–1884) was an American Protestant Episcopal clergyman and author.

Biography
Caleb Sprague Henry was born in Rutland, Massachusetts on August 2, 1804. He graduated from Dartmouth College in 1825 and studied theology at Andover Theological Seminary and New Haven.

In 1828 he became a Congregational minister at Greenfield, Massachusetts, and in 1833 removed to Hartford, Connecticut.  In 1834 he started the American Advocate of Peace, the organ of the American Peace Society.  He then entered the ministry of the Protestant Episcopal church and was professor of moral and intellectual philosophy in Bristol College, Pa., (1835–38).  In 1837, with the aid of Rev. Francis L. Hawks, he established the New York Review.  He was professor of history and philosophy in New York University from 1839 to 1852.

Later he was rector of various churches, but was chiefly engaged in literary work. He translated Guizot's History of Civilization and other works from the French and was the author of several works, including Compendium of Christian Antiquities (1837), Social Welfare and Human Progress (1860), and Satan as a Moral Philosopher (1877).

He died in Newburgh, New York on March 9, 1884.

References

Further reading

 Ronald Vale Wells, Three Christian Transcendentalists: James Marsh, Caleb Sprague Henry, Frederic Henry Hedge, Columbia University Press, 1943.

Dartmouth College alumni
Religious leaders from New York City
1804 births
1884 deaths
American Episcopal priests
19th-century American Episcopalians
People from Greenfield, Massachusetts
People from Rutland, Massachusetts
19th-century American translators
19th-century American clergy